Star Voyager is a first-person space combat game designed by Bob Smith for the Atari 2600 and published in 1982 by Imagic.

Gameplay

In Star Voyager, the player has to save the Capital Starport (although the player never sees it in the game). A two-player mode allows two people to become either the Star Voyager or the enemy fleet. The commander of the Star Voyager has the ability to use missiles or a laser beam in order to stop the enemy. Star portals play a role in transporting the Star Voyager into another part of the galaxy. The game ends when the player dies or runs out of energy. The gameplay is loosely similar to that of the Atari 8-bit game Star Raiders (1979).

References

1982 video games
Atari 2600 games
Atari 2600-only games
North America-exclusive video games
Science fiction video games
Space combat simulators
Imagic games
Multiplayer and single-player video games
Video games developed in the United States